José Alejandro Zapata Perogordo (born 20 November 1958) is a Mexican politician affiliated with the PAN. As of 2013 he served as Senator of the LX and LXI Legislatures of the Mexican Congress representing San Luis Potosí. He also served as Deputy during the LVIII Legislature.

See also
 List of presidents of San Luis Potosí Municipality

References

1958 births
Living people
People from San Luis Potosí City
Members of the Senate of the Republic (Mexico)
Members of the Chamber of Deputies (Mexico)
National Action Party (Mexico) politicians
21st-century Mexican politicians
20th-century Mexican politicians
Politicians from San Luis Potosí
Municipal presidents in San Luis Potosí
Autonomous University of San Luis Potosi alumni